Khorassania compositella is a moth of the family Pyralidae. It is found in the Europe.

The wingspan is 20–24 mm. The moth flies from May to October .

The larvae feed on Artemisia campestris.

Notes
The flight season refers to Belgium. This may vary in other parts of the range.

External links

 Lepidoptera of Belgium

Moths described in 1835
Phycitini
Moths of Europe